Abraham de Jesús Torres Nilo (born August 13, 1992, in León, Guanajuato) is a Mexican professional footballer who currently plays for Los Angeles Force in the National Independent Soccer Association. He made his professional debut with Pachuca during a scoreless Copa MX draw against Atlante on 29 August 2012.

References

External links
 

1992 births
Living people
Mexican footballers
Association football defenders
C.F. Pachuca players
Tlaxcala F.C. players
Potros UAEM footballers
Mineros de Zacatecas players
Club Atlético Zacatepec players
Correcaminos UAT footballers
Los Angeles Force players
Ascenso MX players
Liga Premier de México players
Tercera División de México players
National Independent Soccer Association players
Footballers from Guanajuato
Sportspeople from León, Guanajuato